Josef Schumacher is a former West German slalom canoeist who competed in the 1970s. He won a bronze medal in the C-1 team event at the 1973 ICF Canoe Slalom World Championships in Muotathal.

References

German male canoeists
Living people
Year of birth missing (living people)
Medalists at the ICF Canoe Slalom World Championships